Aeneas is an unincorporated community in Okanogan County in the U.S. state of Washington.

A post office called Aeneas was established in 1908, and remained in operation until 1974. The community was named after an Indian chief.

Gallery

References

Unincorporated communities in Okanogan County, Washington
Unincorporated communities in Washington (state)
Populated places in the Okanagan Country